Odostomia terissa is a species of sea snail, a marine gastropod mollusc in the family Pyramidellidae, the pyrams and their allies.

Distribution
This marine species occurs off Nicaragua.

References

External links
 To World Register of Marine Species

terissa
Gastropods described in 1932